Doi Luang is a district (amphoe) in the northern part of Chiang Rai province, northern Thailand.

History
The area of Doi Luang was separated from Mae Chan district and established as a minor district (king amphoe) on 15 July 1996.

On 15 May 2007, all 81 minor districts were upgraded to full districts. With publication in the Royal Gazette on 24 August, the upgrade became official.

Geography
Neighboring districts are (from the north clockwise) Chiang Saen, Chiang Khong, Wiang Chiang Rung, and Mae Chan.

Administration
The district is divided into three subdistricts (tambons), which are further subdivided into 31 villages (mubans). There are no municipal (thesaban) areas. There are three tambon administrative organizations (TAO).

References

External links

amphoe.com

Doi Luang